Jean-Luc Thiébaut (born 29 December 1960) is a French handball player who competed in the 1992 Summer Olympics.

He was born in Metz.

In 1992 he was a member of the French handball team which won the bronze medal. He played five matches as goalkeeper.

External links
profile

1960 births
Living people
French male handball players
Olympic handball players of France
Handball players at the 1992 Summer Olympics
Olympic bronze medalists for France
Olympic medalists in handball
Sportspeople from Metz
Medalists at the 1992 Summer Olympics